The 1940–41 Copa México Copa México, was the 25th staging of this Mexican football cup competition that existed from 1907 to 1997.

The competition started on March 30, 1941, and concluded on May 18, 1941, with the Final, held at the Parque Asturias in México DF, in which Asturias lifted the trophy for eighth time.

For this edition, Moctezuma and Selección Jalisco did not enter. Also, the team which lose 2 matches is eliminated.

First round

Asturias won

América eliminated

Replay

Atlante eliminated

Asturias bye to final

Marte eliminated

Necaxa eliminated

Final

Club España refused to play the Replay match
Asturias was declared champion

References
Mexico - Statistics of Copa México in season 1940/1941. (RSSSF)

1940 in association football
Copa MX
Copa
1940–41 domestic association football cups